The 3rd Tactical Squadron (known as 3.ELT - 3 Eskadra Lotnictwa Taktycznego in Poland) was a fighter squadron of the Polish Air Force established in 2001 in Poznań, Poland. The squadron was stationed in the 31st Air Base and has acquired  F-16 C/D Block 52+ Adv. fighters. From 1954 to 2001 the unit was known as "3. Pułk Lotnictwa Myśliwskiego". In 2008 the unit was fused with the 6th Tactical Squadron and the 31st Air Base. Those three units were transformed into 31st Tactical Air Base unit.

Equipment

Current 
Fighters:
F-16 C +52 Multirole fighters
F-16 D +52 Multirole fighters
Utility:
Antonov An-2 Utility aircraft
Mil Mi-2 Utility helicopter

Retired
Fighters:
MiG-15 Jet fighters (1954–1958)
MiG-17 Jet fighters (1958–1981)
MiG-19 Jet fighters (1959–1963)
MiG-21 Jet fighters (1963–2003)

Squadron Commanders
 mjr. pilot Wojciech Krupa (January 1, 2001 - October 28, 2002)
 mjr.  pilot  Rościsław Stepaniuk (October 28, 2002 - February 9, 2004)
 col. pilot  Zbigniew Zawada (February 9, 2004 - October 13, 2004)
 mjr.  pilot  Adam Bondaruk (October 13, 2004 - February 25, 2005)
 col. navigator mgr Mariusz Glazer (February 25, 2005 - April 7, 2005)
 mjr.  pilot  mgr Krzysztof Siarkiewicz (April 7, 2005 - October 24, 2005)
 col. pilot  Waldemar Gołębiowski ( current commander from October 24, 2005)

Squadrons of the Polish Air Force